Jolan or Jolán is a given name, female in Magyar (Hungarian), it is the Hungarian version of the female given name Jolanda.
Notable people with the name include :

 Jolan (singer) (born 1993), English singer
 Jolan Babus (1917–1967), Hungarian ethnographer and teacher
 Jolan Chang (1917–2002), Chinese-Canadian sexologist and Taoist philosopher
 Jolán Földes (1902–1963), Hungarian author
 Jolan Gross-Bettelheim, Hungarian graphics artist
 Jolán Kleiber-Kontsek (born 1939), Hungarian athlete who mainly competed in the discus throw event

See also 
 Golan (disambiguation)

de:Jolán